Acerinox, S.A. is a stainless steel manufacturing conglomerate group based in Spain. The company was founded in 1970, and initially received technical support from the Japanese firm Nisshin Steel. Nisshin continues to hold approximately 15% of Acerinox as of April 2010. As for 2008, the company was the world's largest producer of stainless steel.

Companies and factories

Spain
Fábrica del Campo de Gibraltar (Los Barrios)
Roldán SA
Inoxfil SA
Inoxcenter SA
Inoxidables de Galicia SAU
Metalinox Bilbao SA
Inoxmetal SA
Acimetal
Alamak Espana Trade SL
Inoxcenter Canarias SA

Europe
Acerol – Comércio e Indústria de Aços Inoxidáveis (Portugal)
Acerinox France
Acerinox UK Ltd (United Kingdom)
Acerinox Scandinavia AB (Sweden)
Acerinox Schweiz SA (Switzerland)
Acerinox Italia SRL (Italy)
Acerinox Turquía (Turkey)
Acerinox Polska sp. z o.o. (Poland)
VDM Metals, Werdohl, Germany (acquired in 2020)

Rest of the world
Columbus Stainless (South Africa)
Bahru Stainless (Malaysia)
North American Stainless (USA)
Acerinox Argentina
Acerinox Chile

Accidents

In 1998, the Acerinox factory in Los Barrios, Cadiz melted a capsule of cesium-137 that was in a consignment of scrap metal. The radioactive substance was released into the atmosphere and spread over Europe — nuclear authorities in France, Germany, Italy, and Switzerland detected up to 2,400 microbecquerels of ionising radiation in the air, 1,000 times higher than the norm. Two other factories in Huelva and Badajoz also became contaminated by waste transported to them from Acerinox. During the clean-up, 7,000 metric tons of radioactive waste were dumped in Mendaña Marshes, Huelva. The estimated costs of the accident were 20 million US dollars for lost production in the factory, $3 million for clean-up, and $3 million for waste storage.

See also
 List of steel producers

References

External links

Manufacturing companies based in Madrid
Manufacturing companies established in 1970
Companies listed on the Madrid Stock Exchange
Steel companies of Spain
Spanish companies established in 1970
IBEX 35